Gruppo may refer to:

 groupset, a bicycle component manufacturer's organized collection of mechanical parts
Leonard Gruppo (born 1942), a politician in Pennsylvania

See also